Henry George Kay (3 October 1851 – 18 September 1922) was an English first-class cricketer. Kay was a right-handed batsman who played as an occasional wicketkeeper.

Kay represented Hampshire in two first-class matches in 1882, against Sussex and Somerset. In two batting innings for the club, Kay was dismissed for ducks in both.

He was the father of ballet dancer Anton Dolin.

Kay died in Tottenham, Middlesex on 18 September 1922.

External links
Henry Kay at Cricinfo
Henry Kay at CricketArchive

References

1851 births
1922 deaths
People from the Borough of Havant
English cricketers
Hampshire cricketers
Wicket-keepers